The Elizabeth A. Sackler Center for Feminist Art is located on the fourth floor of the Brooklyn Museum, New York City, United States. Since 2007 it has been the home of Judy Chicago's 1979 installation, The Dinner Party.

History
The Elizabeth A. Sackler Center for Feminist Art opened on March 23, 2007, at the Brooklyn Museum as the first public space of its kind in the country; it is a nexus for feminist art, theory, and activism. The  center, located on the museum's fourth floor, aims to create a compelling and interactive environment to raise awareness and educate future generations about feminism’s impact on culture.

Since 2007 the Center has been the permanent home of Judy Chicago's landmark feminist work The Dinner Party.

The Center's Forum is a venue for public programs and a platform of advocacy for women’s issues, and its Feminist Art and Herstory galleries present critically acclaimed exhibitions. The Council for Feminist Art, a membership group, supports the ongoing educational programming and the continuing success of the Elizabeth A. Sackler Center for Feminist Art. The Center's namesake and founder, Elizabeth A. Sackler, is a philanthropist and art collector.

Layout
The Dinner Partys gallery is the centerpiece of a dramatic design for the Elizabeth A. Sackler Center for Feminist Art that was conceived and developed by award-winning architect Susan T. Rodriguez, FAIA, a partner in Ennead Architects. The Dinner Party, which includes 39 placesettings as well as the names of 998 women on a Heritage Floor, is enclosed in large, canting glass walls that provide a first glimpse of Chicago’s work. It is surrounded by a series of distinct, yet interconnected series of galleries that include two changing exhibition galleries and a study center that can be transformed from an academic forum into a multimedia gallery, as required, by a large pivoting wall.

Past exhibitions
The Center's opening exhibition, "Global Feminisms" was the first international exhibit exclusively dedicated to feminist art from 1990 to the present. It was curated by Maura Reilly and Linda Nochlin.

 "Art of Our Own: Women Ceramicists from the Permanent Collection", March 23, 2007 – July 26, 2008
 "Artist Project: Between the Door and the Street", October 10–October 20, 2013
 "Burning Down the House: Building a Feminist Art Collection", October 31, 2008 – April 5, 2009
 "Chicago in L.A.: Judy Chicago's Early Work", 1963–74, April 4–September 28, 2014
 "Eva Hesse Spectres 1960", September 16, 2011 – January 8, 2012
 "The Fertile Goddess", December 19, 2008 – May 31, 2009
 "Ghada Amer: Love Has No End", February 16–October 19, 2008
 "Global Feminisms", March 23–July 1, 2007
 "Global Feminisms Remix", August 3, 2007 – February 3, 2008
 "Healing the Wounds of War: The Brooklyn Sanitary Fair of 1864", January 29–October 17, 2010
 "Judy Chicago’s Feminist Pedagogy and Alternative Spaces", September 29–November 16, 2014
 "Käthe Kollwitz: Prints from the 'War' and 'Death' Portfolios", March 15–November 10, 2013
 "Kiki Smith: Sojourn", February 12–September 12, 2010
 "Lorna Simpson: Gathered", January 28–August 21, 2011
 "Materializing 'Six Years': Lucy R. Lippard and the Emergence of Conceptual Art, September 14, 2012–February 17, 2013
 "Matthew Buckingham: 'The Spirit and the Letter'", September 3, 2011–January 8, 2012
 "Newspaper Fiction: The New York Journalism of Djuna Barnes, 1913–1919, January 20–August 19, 2012
 "Patricia Cronin: Harriet Hosmer, Lost and Found'", June 5, 2009 – January 24, 2010
 "Pharaohs, Queens, and Goddesses", February 3, 2007 – February 3, 2008
 "Rachel Kneebone: Regarding Rodin", January 27–August 12, 2012
 "Reflections on the Electric Mirror: New Feminist Video", May 1, 2009 – January 10, 2010
 "Sam Taylor-Wood: 'Ghosts'", October 30, 2010 – August 14, 2011
 Twice Militant: Lorraine Hansberry’s Letters to 'The Ladder', November 22, 2013 – March 16, 2014
 "Seductive Subversion: Women Pop Artists, 1958–1968", October 15, 2010 – January 9, 2011
 "Votes for Women", February 16–November 30, 2008
 "Wangechi Mutu: A Fantastic Journey", October 11, 2013 – March 9, 2014
 "Wish Tree", November 15, 2012 – January 6, 2013
 "'Workt by Hand': Hidden Labor and Historical Quilts", March 15–September 15, 2013
 Beverly Buchanan—Ruins and Rituals, October 21, 2016 – March 5, 2017
 Marilyn Minter: Pretty/Dirty, November 4, 2016 – May 7, 2017
 Iggy Pop Life Class by Jeremy Deller, November 4, 2016 – June 18, 2017
 Infinite Blue, Opened November 25, 2016
 A Woman’s Afterlife: Gender Transformation in Ancient Egypt, Opened December 15, 2016
 Georgia O’Keeffe: Living Modern, March 3–July 23, 2017
 We Wanted a Revolution: Black Radical Women, 1965–85, April 21–September 17, 2017
 Roots of “The Dinner Party”: History in the Making, October 20, 2017 - March 4, 2018
 "", Radical Women: Latin American Art, 1960–1985
April 13–July 22, 2018

Feminist Art Base
An original initiative from the Center for Feminist Art is its “Feminist Art Base, conceptualized by the Center's founding curator, Maura Reilly.” This database is a self-generated selection of past and present artists, whose work reflect feminist ideas, investments, and concerns, such as Karen Heagle, Julia Kunin and Clarity Haynes.  The database is actively added to with artists from the around the world, who continue to build their profiles. Each profile includes short biographies, CVs, and exemplary works as well as a “Feminist Art Statement.” This personal and living database wishes to be a comprehensive resource for achieving the center's mission: “to present feminism in an approachable and relevant manner, to educate new generations about the meaning of feminist art, and to raise awareness of feminism's cultural contributions.”

First Awards
In March 2012 The Elizabeth A. Sackler Center for Feminist Art celebrated its fifth anniversary by honoring fifteen contemporary women with the Sackler Center First Awards. The awards, conceived by Elizabeth Sackler, are given each year to women who have broken a gender barrier to make a remarkable achievement and contribution in her respective field. The honorees are:

2016:
 Angela Davis

2015:
Miss Piggy

2014:
Anita Hill

2013:  
Julie Taymor

2012:
Associate Justice Sandra Day O’Connor (retired) 
Marin Alsop
Connie Chung 
Johnnetta B. Cole 
Wilhelmina Cole Holladay 
Sandy Lerner 
Lucy R. Lippard 
Chief Wilma Mankiller (posthumous)
Toni Morrison 
Linda Nochlin 
Jessye Norman 
Judith Rodin 
Muriel Siebert 
Susan Stroman 
Faye Wattleton

References

External links
Elizabeth A. Sackler Center for Feminist Art website

2007 establishments in New York City
Art museums established in 2007
Art museums and galleries in New York (state)
Brooklyn Museum
Women's museums in the United States
Feminist art organizations in the United States
Feminism in New York City
Sackler family